Zone 78 is a zone of the municipality of Al Shamal in the state of Qatar. The main districts recorded in the 2015 population census were Abu Dhalouf and Zubarah. 

Other districts which fall within its administrative boundaries are Ain Al Nuaman, Ain Mohammed, Al `Arish, Al Jumail, Al Khuwayr, Al Nabaah, Ar Rakiyat, Ath Thaqab, Freiha, Ghaf Makin, Khidaj, Lisha, Murwab, Ruwayda, Sidriyat Makin, Umm Al Hawa'ir, Umm Al Kilab, Umm al Qubur, Umm Jasim, Yusufiyah.

Demographics

Land use
The Ministry of Municipality and Environment (MME) breaks down land use in the zone as follows.

References 

Zones of Qatar
Al Shamal